Abdollah Javadi Amoli (born ) is an Iranian Twelver Shi'a Marja. He is a conservative and principlist Iranian politician, philosopher and one of the prominent Islamic scholars of the Hawza. The official website for his scientific foundation, Isra, states that his ideas and views have been guidance to the Islamic Republic of Iran since the 1979 Islamic Revolution, and that "his strategic and enlightening guidance" has been "extremely constructive" during the past three decades. He is known as one of the biggest critics of the banking system in Iran.

Early life
He was born in 1933 in Amol, northern Iran to a clerical family. After finishing elementary school he joined Amol seminary in 1946 to seek religious studies. His father, Mirza Abul Hassan Vaez Javadi Amoli, was one of the scholars of Amol city.

Scholarly career 
For five years, he studied the preliminary seminary courses as well as part of the intermediate courses under the supervision of his father Mirza Abul Hassan Vaez Javadi Amoli among other scholars. The foundations of his moral and spiritual development were also laid in Imam Hasan al-Askari mosque.

In 1950 he emigrated to Tehran to attend classes of some of the great intellectual figures of the time such as Ayatollah Sheikh Muhammad Taqi Amoli, Allama Sheikh Abul Hasan Sha'rani and Muhammad Hussein Fazil Tuni where in addition to fiqh and principles, he endeavored in philosophy and mysticism.

In 1955, he emigrated to Qom to attend the last levels of the most advanced scholarly disciplines under such scholars as Ayatollah Hossein Borujerdi, Ayatollah Mostafa Mohaghegh Damad, Ayatollah Mirza Hashem Amoli, Ayatollah Ruhollah Khomeini, Grand Ayatollah Taqi Bahjat Foumani and Allama Muhammad Husayn Tabataba'i.

Among different Islamic disciplines, he has been specially dedicated to the exegesis of the Quran. His exegesis courses started in 1976 and has been ongoing to date.

In politics
Javadi Amoli was the leader of Ayatollah Khomeini's mission to Mikhail Gorbachev, the leader of USSR in January 1988.

On 27 November 2009, he announced his resignation from an influential position as the Friday Prayer Leader in Qom, saying that one should not hold such a position if one has not proven helpful.  He had previously protested unethical approaches to election campaigns. During his farewell address, Amoli clearly pointed out that his resignation was not due to differences with the government but due to health reasons. He continues to attend Friday congregational prayers in the city of Qom even after resigning as the Friday prayer leader.

Views on current issues

Art and music 
In response to a question about the impact of mainstream music on soul, Javadi Amoli said "sometimes a supplication arouses a young Muslim and sometimes a ghazal or a qasida but the pleasure of a ghazal is never found in songs since songs cause only a false pleasure, but ode is a nectar that results in true permanent pleasure. Such are the ghazals by Hafez and Saadi." He further said that there are plays that "awake animalistic temper in man" but that he also knows ones that "revive man's angelic mood inducing detachment from lust and anger."

In answer to another question about permissibly of "spiritual and mystical music," Javadi Amoli argued that man's practical reason can find true softness when it becomes occupied with prayer, supplication and ritual crying, becoming as a result obedient to man's theoretical reason —  which is cultivated in turn by philosophy and theology — thus abstaining deeds disliked by God. Reciting and composing pleasant poems and prose are highly influential in softening the practical reason to this end whereas musical instruments causes only a "false" softness: "there's a difference when one cries for the oppression bore by Imam Husayn compared to when one shed tears only as a result of hearing the beats of mourning plays." This is the hazard posed by the so-called "mystical" music, Javadi argued.

Political views

Muslim unity 

In a meeting with members of the national conference on legal alliance of the Muslim world, Amoli argued that Muslim unity is not achieved merely through preaching, but requires distinguishing the nature of disagreement to find out whether it is in beliefs or merely a difference in inclinations. He referred to history of Shia when different denominations avoided clashes despite different views and united with each other based on jurisprudence as a shared asset. He further argued that "Qur’an and Logic can be counted as the sole factor for alliance of all Muslims."  In another meeting with Maulana Hatem Zeky al Din, a senior cleric of Indian Ismailis, held in Asra International Institute, Javadi Amoli stated that the core of unity among Muslim community is the Quran as well as the Ahl ul-Bayt adding, "Both the holy Quran and Ahl ul-Bayt (a.s) brought the message of monotheism to mankind and invited them to worship Allah; If the Muslim community truly adheres to Ahl ul-Bayt and Quranic teachings their actions will lead to Islamic unity and there will be no discord among the Muslim Ummah."

Harmony of religions 
In a meeting on 5 February 2016 with Monsignor Liberio Andreatta, the head of the Vatican Pilgrimage Organization on Wednesday, Grand Ayatollah Abdollah Javadi-Amoli stated that if the followers of the Abrahamic religions properly follow their prophets, there wouldn't be any conflict between them. He described Takfiri ideology, terrorist groups and proxy wars as creation of "the arrogant powers" hinting at Israel and the United States.

On another occasion he stated that owing to the fact that Divine-inspired prophets have all confirmed their successors, thus approving other faiths, followers of all monotheist faiths have always had peaceful coexistence in Iran which is "a model for the global community."  He further added that civil society will never be established at gun point. "Relying on waging wars and accumulating warfare, the mankind will never manage to build an exalted civilization, as all civilizations throughout history have been established under the umbrella of divine revelations, knowledge, and briefly speaking, the pen,' said the ayatollah.

From the point of view of Abdullah Javadi Amoli, reason is not against religion; It is the beacon of religion, and on the other hand, it can be used to understand the doctrinal, moral, jurisprudential and legal teachings of religion.

Nuclear weapon 
Regarding the Nuclear weapons in February 2014, he said in a video message that the official message of religion and humanity is that weapons of mass destruction should not be produced.

Terrorism and double standard 
In a meeting with Secretary General, Mr. Mohammad Javad Hasheminejad from Habilian Association, an Iranian NGO specializing in terrorism research, Javadi Amoli criticized the West's classification of the Lebanese Shia resistant organization Hezbollah as terrorist  while "depicting some Takfiri groups as freedom fighters," arguing that the West's definition of terrorism is based on its own interests and passion, whereas "we believe divine sources must be relied upon and used to bring justice. So we will never have double standards. We never consider terrorists as freedom fighters neither will we take defenders of national sovereignty as terrorists. While they [West] support one side of the conflict today and name them as terrorists tomorrow, if their interests necessitate it.”

Economy 
In a meeting with a member of Iranian parliament, Javad Amoli criticized the structure of Iran's economy, saying that an economy based on exporting raw materials such as crude oil is not right. "We must process the oil through various means and then export it,” the ayatollah added.

Society 
In a meeting on May 12, 2016, Javadi Amoli lamented the low rate of per capita book reading in Iran despite being "a country of wisdom and rationality" with its people being "socially aware."

Banking and usury 
Javadi Amoli has repeatedly protested the usury of some banking activities under the guise of Islamic banking. His speech with hatred and tears in the classroom about usury had wide repercussions. Among other criticisms, in December 2016 he said, Bank of Iran sucks [the] blood [of] people.

List of works
All works in Persian except noted otherwise.

Regular exegesis of Quran 

 Tasnim Exegesis (40 vols published as of Oct. 2016)

Thematic exegesis of Quran 
 Quran in Quran 
 Monotheism in Quran 
 Revelation and Prophethood in Quran 
 Afterlife in Quran (2 vols) 
 The Life of Messengers in the Quran (2 vols) 
 The Life of the Holy Messenger in the Quran (2 vols) 
 The Foundations of Ethics in Quran 
 The Stages of Ethics in Quran
 Fitra in Quran 
 Epistemology in Quran 
 The Form and Nature of Man in Quran 
 The True Life of Man in Quran
 The Discipline of the Self-Annihilation of the Proximate (Exposition of Ziarat al-Jami'a al-Kabira, 7 vols.)

Ahl al-Bayt and Quran 
 The Extract of Creation 
 Epic and Mysticism: Mysticism of Wilaya
 Treasurer of Love
 Eulogies for Ahl al-Bayt
 The Wilaya Holiday
 The Alid Wisdom
 The Alid Wilaya
 The Manifestation of Wilaya in the Verse of Purification
 Quran in the Speech of Imam Ali
 The Unity of Societies in Nahj al-Balagha
 Ali, the Theophany of the Divine Best Names
 Knowledge of World and Worldliness in Nahj al-Balagha
 The Fruition of Intellect in the Light of Hussain's Uprising
 The Emerge of Wiliaya on the Scene of Ghadir
 The Mystic Life of Imam Ali
 Theoratical and Practical Wisdom in Nahj al-Balagha
 The Scent of Wilaya
 Wilaya in Quran
 The Breeze of Thinking (Q&As on various themes, 2 vols.)
 The Existing Promised Imam Mahdi

Philosophy 
 The Sealed Drink (translit Rahiq Makhtum; Exposition of the Transcendent Theosophy of Mulla Sadra, 17 vols. published as of Jan. 2017) 
 Philosophy of Sadra
 The Philosophy of Human Rights
 Explanation of the Arguments for God
 Ali ibn Musa ar-Ridha and Theosophy (Arabic)
 The Philosophy of Pilgrimage
 Right and Duty in Islam
 The Status of Reason in the Scheme of Religious Gnosis
 The Sun of Revelation from Tabriz (The Practical Life of Allama Tabataba'i)

New theology 
 Man's Expectations of Religion
 The Relation of Faith and World (Critique of Secularism)
 Knowledge of Religion
 Sharia in the Light of Wisdom

Old theology 
 The Rule of the Jurist: the Rule of Jurisprudence and Justice

Jurisprudence 
 Explanation of Practical Matters with Inquiries 
 The Book of Khums
 Legal Inquiries
 The Book of Hajj (4 vols.)
 Revelation and Prophethood (Arabic)

Society and politics  
 The Messenger of Guidance (Amoli's letters and statements, 4 vols)
 Springhead of Thought (6 vols.)
 The Firm Foundation of Imam Khomeini
 Islam and the Environment
 International Relations in Islam
 The Source of Thought (Arabic)

Wisdom 
 The Pilgrimage Wine
 A Sip from the Pilgrimage Wine
 Secrets of Prayer
 The Wise Quran from the Perspective of Imam Ridha 
 The Wisdom of Worship
 Woman in the Mirror of Beauty and Grandeur
 Purity of Quran from Distortion

Mysticism 
 Divine Unity
 Unity in Worship
 Woman in Islam

Hadith 
 The Keys of Life (On conduct and lifestyle)

See also 

 Fatemeh Javadi
 Ruhollah Khomeini's letter to Mikhail Gorbachev
Lists of Maraji
List of members in the First Term of the Council of Experts

References

External links 

 Isra research institute (Persian)
 Biography
 Abdollah Javadi-Amoli on Twitter

Iranian grand ayatollahs
1933 births
Shia Islamists
Living people
People from Amol
Islamic philosophers
Iranian Muslim mystics
Society of Seminary Teachers of Qom members
Members of the Assembly of Experts for Constitution
Iranian ayatollahs
Iran's Book of the Year Awards recipients
Farabi International Award recipients
Marja'